Asia-Pacific (APAC) is the part of the world near the western Pacific Ocean. The Asia-Pacific region varies in area depending on the context, but it often includes countries in East Asia, Southeast Asia, and Oceania that border the Pacific Ocean. South Asia, Mongolia, Myanmar, and the Russian Far East are generally included in a wider Asia-Pacific region (also known as Indo-Pacific).

Definition
The term may include countries in North America and South America that are on the coast of the Eastern Pacific Ocean; the Asia-Pacific Economic Cooperation, for example, includes Canada, Chile, Mexico, Peru, and the United States. Alternatively, the term sometimes comprises all of Asia except Central Asia and Western Asia, as well as Oceania—for example, when dividing the world into large regions for commercial purposes (e.g., into APAC, EMEA, LATAM, and NA). Central Asia and Western Asia are almost never included.

On the whole, there is no clear-cut definition of "Asia-Pacific", and the regions included change depending on the context. The term has become popular since the late 1980s in commerce, finance, and politics. Despite the heterogeneity of the regions' economies, most individual nations within the zone are emerging markets experiencing rapid growth (compare the acronym APEJ, "Asia-Pacific excluding Japan").

Component areas
The Asia-Pacific region generally includes:

Asia

East Asia

North Asia 
  Russian Far East (Russia)

South Asia 
 
 
 
  (United Kingdom)

Southeast Asia

Oceania

Australasia

Melanesia 
 
 
  (France)

Micronesia 
  (United States)
 
 
 
 
  (United States)
 
  (United States)

Polynesia 
  (United States)
  (France)
 
  (Chile)
  Salas and Gómez Island
  (France)
  (United States)
 
  (United Kingdom)
 
  (New Zealand)
 
 
  (United States)
 
 
 
 
 
 
 
  (France)

List of inhabited countries and territories

See also
 Asia-Pacific Economic Cooperation (APEC)
 Asia Pacific Forum
 Asia Pacific Foundation of Canada
 Asia-Pacific Network Information Centre (APNIC)
 Asia Society
 Asian Century
 East Asia Summit
 Eastern world
 East–West dichotomy
 Far East
 Free and Open Indo-Pacific
 Geography of Asia
 Indo-Pacific
 List of country groupings
 Oceania
 Orient
 Pacific Century
 Pacific coast
 Russian Far East
 Siberia
 South Asian Association for Regional Cooperation (SAARC)
 Valeriepieris circle

References

External links
 APEC official website
 The Asia Pacific Foundation of Canada
 Asia Pacific Indigenous Youth Network (APIYN)
 BBC Asia-Pacific 

 
Pacific
Geography of Oceania
Geographical neologisms
Pacific
Regions of Oceania